The term "Cinema of Korea" (or "Korean cinema") encompasses the motion picture industries of North and South Korea. As with all aspects of Korean life during the past century, the film industry has often been at the mercy of political events, from the late Joseon dynasty to the Korean War to domestic governmental interference. While both countries have relatively robust film industries today, only South Korean films have achieved wide international acclaim. North Korean films tend to portray their communist or revolutionary themes.

South Korean films enjoyed a "Golden age" during the late 1950s, and 1960s, but by the 1970s had become generally considered to be of low quality. Nonetheless, by 2005 South Korea became a nation that watched more domestic than imported films in theatres due somewhat to laws placing limits on the number of foreign films able to be shown per theatre per year,  but mostly due to the growth of the Korean entertainment industry which quadrupled in size during this period. In the theaters, Korean films must be played for 73 days per year since 2006, a similar restriction that exists in countries like the UK and France. On cable TV 25% domestic film quota will be reduced to 20% after KOR-US FTA. It has been noted that Korean movies have consistently outperformed foreign with very few exceptions in the Korean box office.

Early period (until 1926) 

According to the October 19, 1897 issue of The Times, "Motion pictures have finally been introduced into Joseon, a country located in the Far East. At the beginning of October 1897, motion pictures were screened for the public in Jingogae, Bukchon, in a shabby barrack that was borrowed from its Chinese owner for three days. The works screened included short films and actuality films produced by France's Pathe Pictures". There are reports of another showing of a film to the public in 1898 near Namdaemun in Seoul. However, these claims have been refuted by researcher Brian Yecies, who says that he was unable to locate such an issue of The Times, or any similar article, and considers the 1897 introduction date a myth.

American traveler and lecturer Burton Holmes was the first to film in Korea as part of his travelogue programs. In addition to displaying his films abroad, he showed them to the Korean royal family in 1899. An announcement in the contemporary newspaper, Hwangseong sinmun (The Imperial), names another early public screening on June 23, 1903. Advertised by the Dongdaemun Electric Company, the price for admission to the viewing of scenic photography was 10 jeon (coin).

Korea's first movie theater, Dongdaemun Motion Picture Studio, was opened in 1903. The Danseong-sa Theater opened in Seoul in November 1907. Before the creation of a domestic film industry, films imported from Europe and the United States were shown in Korean theaters. Some of the imported films of the era most popular with Korean audiences were D. W. Griffith's Broken Blossoms (1919) and Way Down East (1920), Douglas Fairbanks in Robin Hood (1922), and Fritz Lang's Nibelungen films, Siegfried and Kriemhilds Rache (both 1924).

Not merely a theater-operator, as the first film producer in Korea, Danseong-sa's owner, Bak Seong-pil, took an active part in supporting early Korean cinema. He financed the first Korean domestic film, Loyal Revenge (Uirijeok Gutu), as well as the first Korean documentary film, Scenes of Gyeonseong City and showed both at his theater on October 27, 1919. Uirijeok Guto was used as a kino drama, a live theatrical production against the backdrop of film projected on stage.

For the next few years, film production in Korea consisted of the kino dramas and documentaries. As with the first showing of a film in Korea, the first feature film produced in Korea also appears to be unclear. Some name a filming of Chunhyang-Jeon in 1921 (released in 1922) as the first Korean feature film. The traditional story, Chunhyang, was to become Korea's most-filmed story later. It was possibly the first Korean feature film, and was certainly the first Korean sound film, color film and widescreen film. Im Kwon-taek's 2000 pansori version of Chunhyang brought the number of films based on Chunyang to 14. Other sources, however, name Yun Baek-nam's Ulha ui Mengse ("Plighted Love Under the Moon"), released in April, 1923, as the first Korean feature film.

The Golden Era of Silent Films (1926–1930)
Korean film studios at this time were Japanese-operated. A hat-merchant known as Yodo Orajo established a film company called Choson Kinema Productions. After appearing in the Choson Kinema's 1926 production Nongjungjo, the young actor Na Woon-gyu got the chance to write, direct and star in his own film. The release of Na's film, Arirang (1926) is the start of the era of silent film in Korea.

Like the folksong "Arirang", on which its title was based, Na Woon-gyu's Arirang did not have an overtly political theme. However hidden or subtle messages could be magnified through the common use of a live narrator at the theater. A newspaper article of 1908 shows that this tradition of "byeonsa" (or "benshi" in Japanese) appeared in Korea almost from the beginning of the showing of film in the country. As in Japan, this became an integral part to the showing of silent films, especially for imported films, where the byeonsa provided an economical and entertaining alternative to translating intertitles. In an interesting aspect of the byeonsa tradition in Korea, when Japanese authorities were not present the narrators could inject satire and criticism of the occupation into the film narrative, giving the film a political subtext invisible to Japanese government censors. Some of the more popular byeonsa were better-paid than the film actors.

The success of Arirang inspired a burst of activity in the Korean film industry in the late 1920s, causing this period to become known as "The Golden Era of Silent Films". More than seventy films were produced at this time, and the quality of film improved as well as the quantity.

Na Un-gyu followed Arirang with popular and critically respected films like Punguna (풍운아, Person of destiny) (1926) and Deuljwi (들쥐, Vole) (1927). He formed Na Un-gyu Productions with Bak Seong-pil for the purpose of producing films by Koreans for Koreans. Though this company was short-lived, it produced important films like Jalitgeola (잘 있거라, Good bye) (1927), Beongeoli Sam-ryong (벙어리 삼룡, Mute Samryong) (1929), and Salangeul chajaseo (사랑을 찾아서, Finding Love) (1929).

Another important director of this period, Shim Hun, directed only one film, Mondongi Tultte (먼동이 틀 때) (At Daybreak). Though the reviews for this film were as strong as those for Arirang, Shim died at the age of 35 while directing his second film, based on his own novel, Sangroksu (상록수) (The Evergreens). The novel was later filmed by director Shin Sang-ok in 1961 and by Im Kwon-taek in 1978.

A typical feature of movie theaters during this era was the presence of a “film narrator” known as "byeonsa.” The byeonsa operated as ”a narrator that introduces the characters and the setting, and explains the physical actions and psychological dilemmas during silent film screenings.” The byeonsa also functioned ”as a cultural intermediary during the Korean audience’s film-viewing experience, and utilized his narration to complement censorship or technological limitations during the silent film period.”

The later silent era (1930–1935) 
The first half of the 1930s saw a decline in the domestic film industry in Korea. Censorship and oppression on the part of the occupying authorities played a part in reducing the number of films produced at this time to only two or three per year, and some filmmakers fled Korea for the more robust film-industry in Shanghai at this time.

Narrators  could  nevertheless  make  even  worn-out  movies  interesting  and  make  up  for  a  cinema’s  poor  offer.”

Perhaps the most important film of this era, Imjaeobtneun naleutbae (Ferryboat with no Ferryman) (1932), directed by Lee Gyu-hwan (1904–1981), starred Na Woon-gyu. Increasing governmental censorship meant that commentators have called this the last pre-liberation film to present a significant nationalistic message.

Early sound era (1935–1945) 
Korea's first sound film was Lee Myeong-woo's 1935 Chunhyang-jeon. The sound technique was reportedly poor, but Korean audiences appreciated hearing their own language in the cinema.

The number of films produced increased during the latter part of the decade. Na Woon-gyu began making a larger number of films again with significant works like Kanggeonneo maeul (1935), and Oh Mong-nyeo (1937), before his premature death in 1937.

Korea was one of Japan's first and most important centers of colonial film production. Japanese-sponsored shorts, newsreels, and feature films heavily promoted cultural assimilation to colonized Korean audiences. To this end the Korean Colonial Cinema Unit (朝鮮総督府キネマ) was established to produce and distribute films a mixture of films that promoted Japanese culture and customs as well as the benefits of modernization under the Japanese.

Coming as they did during the mid- to late-1930s, sound films in Korea faced much harsher censorship from the Japanese government-General than did the silent films before them. Also, the loss of the byeonsa narrators with the coming of sound film meant that anti-authority messages could no longer be sneaked around the censors in this way. On such example occurred with the importation of the American silent film Ben Hur (1927) into Korea. While Japanese colonial censors failed to find anything possibly inflammatory about the film, the byeonsa immediately recognized and alerted audiences to the obvious parallels between the conditions of the Jews onscreen with those of the Koreans under Japanese colonial rule resulting in the film setting off a near riot.

Japanese film censors replaced American and European films with Japanese films as part of the larger colonial project to culturally colonize Korea. Japanese films set in Korea appealed to audiences in Japan as a form of exotica. Suicide Troops of the Watchtower (望楼の決死隊, 1943), for instance, was one of several propaganda features that promoted the Japanese occupation notion of naisen ittai or "Japan and Korea as one body." Although Japanese film production in Korea began in the early 1930s, total mobilization and consolidation of the Korean film industry under the Japanese would not begin until after Japan's full-scale invasion of China in 1937. Film was an important way by which the Japanese maintained colonial control in Korea through the promotion of assimilationist policies. For example, in 1941 Japan's Shochiku Studios together with the Japanese-sponsored Korean Military Information Division co-produced the film You and I (君と僕). The film was directed by a Korean Hae Yeong who had worked extensively in the Japanese film industry using the name "Hinatsu Eitaro". You and I promoted the "volunteer" enlistment of Koreans into the imperial Japanese Army and carried as a subplot the interracial marriage between a Japanese woman and a Korean man. After the film was completed, Hae went to Java in Indonesia where he continued to make documentaries for the Japanese. After the war, he changed his name to Dr. Huyung, married an Indonesian woman with whom he had two sons, and produced three important Indonesian films. Before his death in 1952, he told a close friend, "If I returned to Japan now there wouldn't be any jobs for me and if I returned to Korea, I'd most likely be branded a Japanese collaborator." Although the Japanese Colonial Administration officially banned the Korean language, the Japanese film studios operating in Korea continued to make films with characters who spoke it until the end of the war.

After Liberation (1945-1954) 
Most of the movies in 1946 and 1947 right after Korea's liberation from Japan's colonial rule were films that expressed the thrill of Korea's liberation. In 1946, Choi In-kyu founded the Goryeo Film Company and released Free Manse (자유만세), which was a huge success in the box office, followed by Lee Gu-young’s Records of Ahn Jung-geun (안중근 사기), Yoon Bong-chun’s Matyr Yunbong Gil (윤봉길 의사), Jeon Chang-geun’s My liberated Hometown (해방된 내 고향), and Lee Kyu-hwan’s Adventures of Ddol-ddol (똘똘이의 모험). Then in 1947, Yun Bong-chun’s Yu Gwan-sun (유관순), Shin Kyung-kyun’s The New Oath (새로운 맹세) were released. The following year, in 1948, Choi In-kyu’s Innocent Prisoner (죄없는 죄인), Lee Kyu-hwan’s Seagulls (갈매기), Han Hyung-mo's Break the Wall (성벽을 뚫고) were produced. 

During the Korean War in 1950, the filmmakers were once again in a time of hardship, but in 1952, Jeon Chang-geun directed Nakdong River (낙동강) and Lee Man-heung directed Affectionate Mountains (애정산맥) and Shin Sang-ok, a student of Choi In-gyu,  Devil's Night (악야) and Jeong Chang-hwa’s The Last Temptation (최후의 유혹). Returning to the capital in 1954, the filmmakers made the film persistently despite the new challenge of flooding foreign films. In 1954, Kim Seong-min’s 41 degrees north latitude (북위 41도), Yun Bong-chun’s Song of the hometown (고향의 노래), Hong Sung-ki’s Sortie (출격명령), and Shin Sang-ok’s Korea (코리아). In May 1955,  tax exemption measures were implemented for Korean films, which later served as a major occasion for Korean films to enjoy the heyday. Lee Kyu-hwan’s Chunhyangjeon (춘향전) was released in 1955 and made the renaissance of Korean films.

Heyday (1955-1979) 
In a comparison of the number of films produced in Korea, there were 166 films produced in the early period from 1919 to 1945, 86 films produced in the period from 1946 to 1953 and 2,021 films produced in the period from 1954 to 1970. The tax exemption measures, the introduction of the latest film making machine and increase of movie goers have greatly encouraged the filmmakers. The new genres such as teen movies and literary films emerged from the early to the mid-1960s. Kim Ki-young's The Housemaid was released in 1960. Shin Seong-il earned stardom through films such as The Barefooted Youth (맨발의 청춘), Youth Classroom (청춘교실) and Rye (흑맥) around this time. In 1961, Shin Sang-ok’s The Houseguest and My Mother (사랑방 손님과 어머니) and Yu Hyun-mok's Aimless Bullet (Obaltan, 오발탄) were produced. Lee Man-hee's Late Autumn (만추) in 1966 and Choi Ha-won's The Old Pottery Maker (독 짓는 늙은이) in 1969 improved the quality of Korean films. Jung So-young's Love Me Once Again (미워도 다시 한번) earned a huge-success in box office.

In the 1970s, however, Korean film industry again faced a recession and began to look for breakthroughs with Lee Jang-ho's Heavenly Homecoming of Stars (별들의 고향) in 1974 and Kim Ho-sun's Winter Woman (겨울여자) in 1977. The emergence of Lee Jang-ho, Kim Ho-seon and Ha Gil-jong in the 70s was part of a generational shift in directors and a prediction of the young directors with new senses. In 1974, director Lee Jang-ho’s Heavenly homecoming of Stars attracted as many as 470,000 viewers alone at Kuk-do theater in Seoul and marked sixth place in the box office among all films released in the 70s. In 1975, director Kim Ho-seon’s Yeong-ja’s Heydays  (영자의 전성시대) was also a huge box office hit, attracting 360,000 viewers. March of the Fools (바보들의 행진) directed by Ha Gil-jong was highly acclaimed for its sensuous portrayal of the romance and wandering of youth with college students in 1975.

The introduction of the import quota system for foreign films and the consequent import regulations under the 1970s prompted fierce competition to win the right to import foreign films rather than the development of Korean films, and the fall of Korean films began slowly in the mid-70s.

Divided Korea ― South Korea

Box office

Divided Korea ― North Korea

See also

 Abduction of Shin Sang-ok and Choi Eun-hee
 Cinema of the world
 List of Korean-language films
 List of Korean films of 1919–1948
 List of North Korean films
 List of South Korean films
 Korean animation
 Korean Blockbuster Movies
 Korean Film Archive
 Korean horror
 Korean Movie Database
 Korean Wave
 East Asian cinema
 Asian cinema
 Hallyuwood
 Sageuk
South Korean Queer Cinema

References

Notes 

 
 
 
 Lee, Sangjon (ed.) (2019). Rediscovering Korean Cinema. Ann Arbor, Michigan: University of Michigan Press. .
 
 
 
 
 
 
 New Korean Cinema (2005), ed. by Chi-Yun Shin and Julian Stringer. Edinburgh: Edinburgh University Press. .
 Pok Hwan-mo (1997). "On Korean Documentary Film". YIDFF Documentary Box 10,3.
.

External links 

 Korean Film Council's YouTube Channel with old Korean films subtitled in English
 Korean Film Archive collection at Google Arts & Culture project